William Wesley Furgerson (June 14, 1929 – September 21, 2006) was an American football and track and field coach. He served as the head football coach at Murray State University in Murray, Kentucky from 1967 to 1977, compiling a record of 60–49–4. He served as the men's track coach at Murray State from 1956 to 1965.

Head coaching record

College football

References

External links
 Murray State Hall of Fame profile
 

1929 births
2006 deaths
Murray State Racers football coaches
Murray State Racers football players
College cross country coaches in the United States 
College track and field coaches in the United States
High school football coaches in Kentucky
High school football coaches in Illinois
People from Calloway County, Kentucky
Coaches of American football from Kentucky
Players of American football from Kentucky